Pregnant Fantasy ( 創造妊娠 — Souzou Ninshin) is the debut album of the Japanese art punk band Tsu Shi Ma Mi Re. It was released on August 25, 2004 in Japan, and then on November 1, 2005 in North America.

Japanese track listing
"うめうまいタネデカイ"　Umeumai Tanedekai
"ランジェリーショップ"　Ranjerii Shoppu
"海老原眞治"　Ebihara Shinji
"マンホール"　Manhooru
"おちゃっすか"　Ochassuka
"ケダマ"　Kedama
"きゃまぼ子"　Kyamaboko
"創造妊娠"　Souzou Ninshin

North American track listing
"Umeboshi Plums - Big Seeds" – 4:08
"Lingerie Shop" – 3:16
"Ebihara Shinji" – 2:28
"Manhole" – 5:38
"Tea time Ska" – 5:10
"Kedama Boogie" – 3:50
"Fish Cakes" – 3:10
"Pregnant Fantasy" – 5:10

References

External links
 Benten Label Tokyo online store

Tsu Shi Ma Mi Re albums
2004 debut albums